Roc Thomas (born September 2, 1995) is an American football running back for the Calgary Stampeders of the Canadian Football League (CFL). He played college football at Auburn and Jacksonville State.

Early years
Thomas attended and played high school football at Oxford High School.

College career
Thomas attended and played college football at Auburn and later transferred to Jacksonville State.

Professional career

Minnesota Vikings
Thomas signed with the Minnesota Vikings as an undrafted free agent on April 30, 2018. After making the initial 53-man roster, Thomas made his NFL debut in Week 4 against the Los Angeles Rams on Thursday Night Football. In the 38–31 loss, he had a four-yard rush. On November 7, 2018, the Vikings waived Thomas. He was re-signed to the practice squad the next day. He signed a reserve/future contract with the Vikings on January 2, 2019. Overall, Thomas finished his rookie season with eight carries for 30 rushing yards to go along with two receptions for 21 receiving yards.

Thomas was suspended the first three games of the 2019 season for three games for violation of the league’s substance abuse policy. Days after the suspension announcement, the Vikings waived Thomas on July 22, 2019.

Jacksonville Jaguars
On August 4, 2019, Thomas was signed by the Jacksonville Jaguars, but was waived/injured six days later and placed on injured reserve. He was waived with an injury settlement on August 26.

Thomas was reinstated from suspension on September 24, 2019.

Calgary Stampeders
Thomas signed with the Calgary Stampeders on February 14, 2020.

References

External links
Jacksonville Jaguars bio
Minnesota Vikings bio
Auburn Tigers bio
Jacksonville State Gamecocks bio

1995 births
Living people
People from Oxford, Alabama
Players of American football from Alabama
American football running backs
Auburn Tigers football players
Jacksonville State Gamecocks football players
Minnesota Vikings players
Jacksonville Jaguars players
Calgary Stampeders players